Below are the names and numbers of the steam locomotives that comprised the LB&SCR Class A1/A1X, which ran on the London, Brighton and South Coast Railway, and latterly the Southern Railway network. The original names mainly denoted various places served by the LB&SCR.

Fleet

References

Sources

A1!
0-6-0T locomotives
LbandScr A1 Class Locomotives
LbandScr A1 Class Locomotives